Alex Mauricio Pineda Chacón (born 19 December 1969 in Santa Cruz de Yojoa) is a retired Honduran footballer.

Professional career
Chacón spent most of his career with Club Olimpia of Honduras, joining the side in 1988, and leading the team to two Honduran championships and a CONCACAF Champions' Cup in 1988. He later played with UA Tamaulipas of Mexico during the 1993–94 season, and then for Sporting Cristal of Peru during the 1994–95 season, appearing in four Copa Libertadores matches.

In 2001, Chacón joined Major League Soccer side Miami Fusion. During the 2001 season, Chacón played a crucial attacking role on a team stacked with offensive talent, including Preki, Diego Serna, Ian Bishop, and Chris Henderson. Chacón registered 19 goals and 9 assists for the team and led the league in goals and points. He was recognized with the MLS Most Valuable Player Award.

The Fusion were contracted after the 2001 season along with the Tampa Bay Mutiny, and he was unable to recapture the form that served him well in his first year. He was selected by the New England Revolution in the 2002 MLS Dispersal Draft, but the emergence of Taylor Twellman and the arrival of a new manager Steve Nicol led to a diminished role on the squad for Chacón. He moved to the Los Angeles Galaxy after the 2002 season and soon later to the Columbus Crew, but neither move reinvigorated his career.

After the 2003 season, Chacón, without a place in MLS, moved to the American A-League, where he found plenty of playing time for the Atlanta Silverbacks. Although he only registered 3 goals and 2 assists in 2004, Chacón's leadership was recognized with a selection to the A-League All-League first team.

International career
Pineda Chacón made his debut for Honduras in a December 1992 FIFA World Cup qualification match against Costa Rica and has earned a total of 45 caps, scoring 5 goals. He has represented his country in 12 FIFA World Cup qualification matches and played at the 1993 UNCAF Nations Cup as well as at the 1993, 1996, 1998 and 2000 CONCACAF Gold Cups.

His final international was an April 2000 FIFA World Cup qualification against Nicaragua.

International goals

Coaching career
Chacón joined the Silverbacks as an assistant coach in 2007. The squad when on hiatus for the 2008 and 2009 seasons, but Chacón remained in the role. While the club was being restructured, he coached youth soccer club Forsyth Fusion, now known as the United Futbol Academy.

After four years with the club as an assistant, he was named head coach on 7 November 2011.

Alex Pineda Chacón has been released from his duties Coaching the Silverbacks in June 2012 after an unsuccessful season.

Personal life
Chacón has now settled in Georgia with his wife and two daughters.

Honours and awards

Country
Honduras
Copa Centroamericana (1): 1993

Club
C.D. Olimpia
Liga Profesional de Honduras (4): 1989–90, 1992–93, 1996–97, 1998–99
Honduran Cup: (2): 1995, 1998
Honduran Supercup: (1): 1997
CONCACAF Champions' Cup (1): 1988
Sporting Cristal
Torneo Descentralizado (2): 1994, 1995

Individual
Liga Nacional de Honduras Top Scorer (1): 1993–94
MLS Most Valuable Player (1): 2001
MLS Golden Boot (1): 2001
MLS Scoring Champion (1): 2001
MLS Best XI (1): 2001
MLS Fair Play Award (1): 2001

References

External links
 

1969 births
Living people
People from Cortés Department
Association football forwards
Honduran footballers
Honduras international footballers
1993 CONCACAF Gold Cup players
1996 CONCACAF Gold Cup players
1998 CONCACAF Gold Cup players
2000 CONCACAF Gold Cup players
C.D. Olimpia players
Correcaminos UAT footballers
Sporting Cristal footballers
Miami Fusion players
New England Revolution players
LA Galaxy players
Columbus Crew players
Atlanta Silverbacks players
Liga Nacional de Fútbol Profesional de Honduras players
Major League Soccer players
Honduran expatriate footballers
Expatriate footballers in Mexico
Expatriate footballers in Peru
Expatriate soccer players in the United States
Honduran expatriate sportspeople in Mexico
Honduran expatriate sportspeople in the United States
Major League Soccer All-Stars
Atlanta Silverbacks coaches
North American Soccer League coaches
Honduran football managers